Helen Baker was a female tennis player. In 1920, she was a runner-up in the women's doubles at the US Open (then U.S. National Championships), paired with Eleanor Tennant, and they lost 6–3, 6–1 against Marion Zinderstein and Eleanor Goss.

Grand Slam finals

Doubles: (1 runner-up)

References

American female tennis players
Year of birth missing
Year of death missing